The 1991 Hi-Tec British Open Squash Championships was held at the Lambs Squash Club with the later stages being held at the Wembley Conference Centre in London from 15–22 April 1991. The event was won by Lisa Opie who defeated Sue Wright in the final.

Seeds

Draw and results

Qualifying round

First round

Second round

Quarter finals

Semi finals

Final

References

Women's British Open Squash Championships
Women's British Open Squash Championship
Women's British Open Squash Championship
Squash competitions in London
Women's British Open Squash Championship
British Open Squash Championship
Women's British Open Squash Championship